Carapoia is a genus of South American cellar spiders that was first described by M. A. González-Sponga in 1998.

Species
 it contains forty-five species, found in Guyana, Venezuela, Peru, Argentina, and Brazil:
Carapoia abdita Huber, 2016 – Brazil
Carapoia agilis Huber, 2018 – Brazil
Carapoia alagoas Huber, 2016 – Brazil
Carapoia bispina Huber, 2018 – Brazil
Carapoia brescoviti Huber, 2005 – Brazil
Carapoia cambridgei (Mello-Leitão, 1947) – Brazil
Carapoia capixaba Huber, 2016 – Brazil
Carapoia carvalhoi Huber, 2016 – Brazil
Carapoia carybei Huber, 2016 – Brazil
Carapoia crasto Huber, 2005 – Brazil
Carapoia dandarae Huber, 2016 – Brazil
Carapoia divisa Huber, 2016 – Brazil
Carapoia djavani Huber, 2018 – Brazil
Carapoia exigua Huber, 2018 – Brazi
Carapoia fowleri Huber, 2000 – Brazil, Guyana?
Carapoia genitalis (Moenkhaus, 1898) – Brazil
Carapoia gracilis Huber, 2016 – Brazil
Carapoia jiboia Huber, 2016 – Brazil
Carapoia kaxinawa Huber, 2018 – Brazil
Carapoia levii (Huber, 2000) – Brazil
Carapoia lutea (Keyserling, 1891) – Brazil, Argentina
Carapoia macacu Huber, 2016 – Brazil
Carapoia maculata Huber, 2018 – Brazil
Carapoia marceloi Huber, 2016 – Brazil
Carapoia mirim Huber, 2016 – Brazil
Carapoia munduruku Huber, 2018 – Brazil
Carapoia nairae Huber, 2016 – Brazil
Carapoia ocaina Huber, 2000 – Peru, Brazil
Carapoia paraguaensis González-Sponga, 1998 (type) – Venezuela, Guyana, Brazil
Carapoia patafina Huber, 2016 – Brazil
Carapoia pau Huber, 2016 – Brazil
Carapoia pulchra Huber, 2018 – Brazil
Carapoia rheimsae Huber, 2005 – Brazil
Carapoia rubra Huber, 2018 – Brazil
Carapoia saltinho Huber, 2016 – Brazil
Carapoia septentrionalis Huber, 2016 – Brazil
Carapoia suassunai Huber, 2018 – Brazil
Carapoia tapajos Huber, 2018 – Brazil
Carapoia tenuis Huber, 2018 – Brazil
Carapoia ubatuba Huber, 2005 – Brazil
Carapoia una Huber, 2005 – Brazil
Carapoia utinga Huber, 2018 – Brazil
Carapoia viridis Huber, 2016 – Brazil
Carapoia voltavelha Huber, 2016 – Brazil
Carapoia zumbii Huber, 2016 – Brazil

See also
 List of Pholcidae species

References

Araneomorphae genera
Pholcidae
Spiders of South America